Ulbersdorf is a railway station in the village of Ulbersdorf, Saxony, Germany. The station lies on the Bautzen–Bad Schandau railway. The station is served by one train service, operated by DB Regio in cooperation with České dráhy: the National Park Railway. This service connects Děčín and Rumburk via Bad Schandau and Sebnitz.

References

Deutsche Bahn website
Städtebahn Sachsen website

External links
Network map

Railway stations in Saxony
Hohnstein